Jonathan Ryan is an Irish actor.

Ryan has also played Gerry Adams and Proinsias De Rossa on screen.

Biography
As a pupil at C.B.C. Monkstown in 1963, Jonathan played rhythm guitar and shared vocals in the Rhythm & Blues band ROOTZGROOP, with Robbie Brennan, Rodney Williams, Dave McAnaney and Paul Brady.

Ryan's acting career began while still a full-time student, making his debut playing ‘Dan’ opposite Lynn Redgrave and Dan O'Herlihy in A Better Place at Dublin's Gate Theatre in 1972. He turned full-time in 1978 and since then has worked extensively on stage, in TV, film and radio and has been one of Ireland's busiest voiceover artists for forty-two years. He has recorded TV and radio commercials for clients worldwide, winning several awards for his work in this field.

Filmography
 Stokes in The Outsider (1980), starring Sterling Hayden
 The priest in Bob Quinn's Budawanny (1987)
 Gibson in Taffin (1988), starring Pierce Brosnan
 Jimmy Reardon in Patriot Games (1992), starring Harrison Ford
 Scottish Prison Governor in In the Name of the Father (1993), starring Daniel Day-Lewis
 Broken Harvest (1994) as Narrator
 Goldsmith in Moll Flanders (1996), starring Morgan Freeman and Robin Wright Penn
 Hamish MacDonald in Kidnapped, starring Armand Assante
 Gerry Adams in Omagh (2004), starring Gerry McSorley
 The Major in John Vaughan's Valour (2006), starring Dave Duffy
 The Teacher in John Vaughan's My Dad (2007), starring Michael Liebmann and Jack Ryan
 The Father in The Portrait (2007), with Catherine Steadman
 Proinsias De Rossa in Brendan Smyth: Betrayal of Trust (TV movie)
 Sergeant Kenefick in Grabbers 2012 (post-production), starring Richard Coyle
 Howard Wakefield in Chasing Leprechauns 2012 (TV movie) (post-production)

Television
 Bosco Voice of Bosco (in the pilot series only) and Himself as presenter in the main series (RTÉ)
 'Schooner' Cooney in Bracken (RTÉ)
 Doctor Jerome Hickey in The Irish RM (9 episodes, 1984–1985) Channel 4/RTÉ
 Randall McDonnell in The Year of the French (RTÉ)
 Heinz Fromme in Caught in a Free State (RTÉ)
 Sheridan in Summer Lightning (Channel 4)
 Against All Odds (BBC)
 27 characters in Twink – RTÉ
 Tom Crowe in The Templewood Murder Mystery – RTÉ
 James Flanigan in Die glückliche Familie for Süddeutscher Rundfunk (1987)
 Hochzeitsreisen 'Verliebt, Verlobt, Verheiratet' for Norddeutscher Rundfunk
 Plunkett in Proof II (RTÉ)
 The French Ambassador in Seasons 1 – 3 of The Tudors (Showtime/BBC)
 Greg Hartnett in The Clinic (Season 5) RTÉ/Parallel Films
 Bill Taylor in Fair City (RTÉ)
 Iron Islands Priest in Game of Thrones (HBO)
 Nobleman in Vikings (2013 TV series) (History Channel)
 Baron Broadmore in Into The Badlands (AMC)

Theatre
 Jacob Milne in Night and Day – at the Abbey Theatre – Dublin Theatre Festival 1981
 Bob in The Silver Dollar Boys – at the Peacock and Abbey Theatres
 Guildenstern in Michael Bogdanov's production of Hamlet – at the Abbey Theatre
 Archer in The Beaux Stratagem – at the Abbey Theatre
 Miles in The Death and Resurrection of Mister Roche – at the Abbey Theatre
 Dan in A Better Place – at the Gate Theatre
 The Gentleman Caller in The Glass Menagerie – at the Gate Theatre
 Giovanni in Innocence (The Life of Caravaggio) – at the Gate Theatre
 Aslak and Balloon in Peer Gynt – at the Gate Theatre
 Tigellinus in Salomé – at the Gate Theatre (Toured to the Edinburgh Festival and Spoleto Festival USA in Charleston, South Carolina)
 Bill Sikes in the Noel Pearson/Cameron Mackintosh production of Oliver! – at the Olympia Theatre
 Abanazar in Aladdin – at the Olympia Theatre
 Gaston Laschailles in Gigi! – at the Gaiety Theatre
 Oscar Lindquist in Sweet Charity – at the Gaiety Theatre
 Mortimer Brewster in Arsenic and Old Lace – at the Gaiety Theatre – Dublin Theatre Festival 1985
 Bogart in Woody Allen's Play it again, Sam – at the Eblana Theatre
 Marlowe in Paddy Meegan's Kiss n'Tell – at the Andrew's Lane Theatre
 Liam in Liam Liar – at the Pavilion and Oscar Theatres
 Joe Fell in I Do Not Like Thee, Doctor Fell – at the Oscar Theatre
 Mister Toad in Toad of Toad Hall – at the Oscar Theatre
 Paul Sheldon in Stephen King's Misery, with Helen Norton – on Irish national tour.
 We Do It for Love, The Colleen Bawn, The Cuchulainn Cycle, The Evangelist, A Midsummer Night's Dream and Grease – all at the Lyric Theatre Belfast.
 Benvolio in Romeo and Juliet, with The Dublin Theatre Festival production on tour to the City Theatre Hong Kong.
 Performed The Durkan Suite, accompanied by composer Bill Whelan and the London Chamber Orchestra.
 Adolf in Roger Doyle's Adolf Gebler Clarinettist, with the RTÉ Concert Orchestra – both at the National Concert Hall Dublin

Awards
The Irish International Advertising Awards Festival:
Premier (Individual) Craft Award – 
Individual Craft Award.

The Institute of Creative Advertising and Design (ICAD) Awards:
Individual Craft Award for Best Performance on Radio or TV – 
Individual Award for Exceptional Merit – 
Individual Craft Award.

References

External links
JonathanRyan.com
voiceover.ie
 

Year of birth missing (living people)
Living people
Irish male film actors
Irish male soap opera actors
Irish male television actors
Irish male voice actors
People educated at C.B.C. Monkstown